CKMN-FM is a community radio station that operates at 96.5 MHz (FM) in Rimouski, Quebec, Canada.

Owned by La radio communautaire du comté Rimouski et Mont-Joli, the station received CRTC licensing in 1989.

The station is a member of the Association des radiodiffuseurs communautaires du Québec.

References

External links
www.ckmn.fm
 

Kmn
Kmn
Kmn
Radio stations established in 1989
1989 establishments in Quebec